The first series of Spirited, an Australian drama television series, began airing on 25 August 2010 on W. The season concluded on 13 October 2010 after 8 episodes.

Spirited follows dentist Suzy Darling (Claudia Karvan), who walks away from a loveless marriage and into an old apartment block that is inhabited by the ghost of a 1980s English rock star Henry Mallet (Matt King). Suzy had been married to husband Steve Darling (Rodger Corser) for 15 years and they have two children son Elvis (Louis Fowler), 13, and daughter Verity (Charlie Hancock), 8. Belinda Bromilow also stars as Suzy's sister Jonquil. It is revealed that although Suzy is the only human able to see Henry, animals such as the resident cat are able to sense his presence, however Henry has been able to frighten the caretaker into a heart attack by blowing into his ear.

The season was to be released on DVD on 20 April 2011 under the title, Spirited: Season 1.

Cast

Regular
 Claudia Karvan as Suzy Darling
 Matt King as Henry Mallet
 Rodger Corser as Steve Darling
 Belinda Bromilow as Jonquil
Louis Fowler as Elvis Darling
Charlie Hancock as Verity Darling

Episodes

{| class="wikitable plainrowheaders" style="width:100%;"
|- style="color:white"
! style="background: #005E80;" | No. inseries
! style="background: #005E80;" | No. inseason
! style="background: #005E80;" | Title
! style="background: #005E80;" | Directed by
! style="background: #005E80;" | Written by
! style="background: #005E80;" | Original air date
|-

|}

References

2010 Australian television seasons